Nikola the Serb (late 14th century) was a Serbian Orthodox hieromonk, protopsaltes (chief singer) and one of the known composers of the Serbian Middle Ages, alongside Kir Stefan the Serb, Isaiah the Serb and Kir Joakim.

Work
Cherubic Hymn, held at the Athens Museum. It is based on a Greek text, and exists in both Church Slavonic and Greek versions

See also
Kir Joakim
Isaiah the Serb
John Kukuzelis
Kir Stefan the Serb
Manuel Chrysaphes

Annotations
Name: also Nicholas the Serb.

References

14th-century Serbian people
14th-century composers
Christian hymnwriters
Medieval Serbian Orthodox clergy
Medieval singers
Serbian composers
Serbian monks
Medieval male composers